John Eisele (John Lincoln Eisele; January 18, 1884 – March 30, 1933) was an American athlete.  He won the silver medal in the 3 mile team race and bronze medal in the 3,200 meters steeplechase at the 1908 Summer Olympics in London.

Eisele was the only runner in his first round heat to finish, moving to the final after running the first round in 11:13.6.  He kept pace with the leader, Arthur Russell of Great Britain and Ireland, from about the halfway mark to the bell.  Archie Robertson, also of Britain, passed him then.  Eisele finished third, about twenty-five yards behind the British pair.  His time was 11:00.8. He also won a silver medal in the 3 miles team race together with George Bonhag and Herbert Trube.

See also
List of Princeton University Olympians

References

External links 
 Profile at Sports-Reference.com

Athletes (track and field) at the 1908 Summer Olympics
American male middle-distance runners
1884 births
1933 deaths
American male steeplechase runners
Medalists at the 1908 Summer Olympics
Olympic silver medalists for the United States in track and field
Olympic bronze medalists for the United States in track and field